Horlicks (07 October 1983 – 24 August 2011) was an outstanding Thoroughbred racemare from New Zealand. She won the internationally contested 1989 Japan Cup in a world record time of 2:22 for 2,400 metres.  In addition to the Japan Cup, she won five Group One (G1) races in Australia and New Zealand.

Breeding
Horlicks was by Three Legs (GB) from the unraced mare, Malt, by Moss Trooper (USA). Malt was later sold to the United States by Australian Bloodstock agent Brian King.

Racing record
The grey mare was owned by Graham de Gruchy of Hastings and trained by Dave and Paul O'Sullivan.

Big race wins
 1989 Japan Cup
 1989 LKS MacKinnon Stakes
 1988 Television New Zealand Stakes 
 1990 Television New Zealand Stakes 
 1989 DB Draught Classic beating The Phantom and Castletown
 1990 DB Draught Classic beating Regal City and Westminster

Horlicks retired from racing with a record of 17 wins and 12 places from 40 starts and career earnings of NZ$4,165,407.

Stud record
Horlicks has also proven to be an outstanding broodmare, as the dam of the 2000 Melbourne Cup winner Brew (by Sir Tristram), and the ill-fated stakes winner Bubble. Another daughter, Latte, was the dam of G1 AJC Australian Derby winner, Fiumicino.

In 2006 Horlicks delivered her 13th foal, a colt by One Cool Cat, at Cambridge Stud in New Zealand and was retired from stud duties at the age of 24 years.

Horlicks died on 24 August 2011 at Cambridge Stud and is buried at her breeder and owner's (Graham de Gruchy) stud farm.

Pedigree

See also
 Thoroughbred racing in New Zealand
 List of millionaire racehorses in Australia

References

1983 racehorse births
Racehorses bred in New Zealand
Racehorses trained in New Zealand
Japan Cup winners
New Zealand Racing Hall of Fame horses
2011 racehorse deaths
Thoroughbred family 10-d